Justice League is an American animated television series which ran from November 17, 2001, to May 29, 2004, on Cartoon Network. The show was produced by Warner Bros. Animation. It is based on the Justice League of America and associated comic book characters published by DC Comics. It serves as a follow up to Batman: The Animated Series, and Superman: The Animated Series and is the seventh series of the DC Animated Universe. It also serves as a prequel to Batman Beyond. After two seasons, the series was rebranded as Justice League Unlimited, a successor series which aired for three seasons.

It was the first show on Cartoon Network to be produced by Warner Bros. Animation, and was the last Cartoon Network show to be greenlit by Betty Cohen.

Overview
Bruce Timm, who co-produced Batman: The Animated Series and Superman: The Animated Series in the 1990s, became producer on an animated series focusing on the Justice League. The roster consisted of Batman, Superman, Wonder Woman, Green Lantern (John Stewart),  The Flash (Wally West), Martian Manhunter (J'onn J'onzz), and Hawkgirl.

According to audio commentary on the DVD release of Season 2, the second-season finale "Starcrossed" was expected to be the final episode of the series. However, in February 2004, Cartoon Network announced a follow-up series, Justice League Unlimited, which premiered on July 31, 2004, and featured a larger roster of characters.

It is the first series in the DC Animated Universe to fully use digital ink and paint, also the first to be produced in widescreen starting in Season 2.

Production
Kevin Conroy reprised his voice role as Batman from Batman: The Animated Series (1992–1995), The New Batman Adventures (1997–1999), and Batman Beyond (1999–2001). Batman's costume was redesigned, but this time, his costume was a combination of his last three costumes. The same costume from The New Batman Adventures is retained, but with the blue highlights from the Batman: The Animated Series costume and the long-ears from the Batman Beyond costume are added to the costume.

Tim Daly, who voiced Superman in Superman: The Animated Series (1996–2000) was initially involved but was unable to continue his role due to involvement with The Fugitive (a short-lived remake of the original 1963 TV series), and was replaced by George Newbern.

Alongside Kevin Conroy and George Newbern as Superman, joining the rest of the main cast is Susan Eisenberg as Wonder Woman, Maria Canals-Barrera as Hawkgirl, Phil Lamarr as John Stewart, Michael Rosenbaum as Wally West / The Flash and Carl Lumbly as J'onn J'onnz / Martian Manhunter.

Superman was initially redesigned to have a bit of a squint to his eyes as well as cheekbones that were meant to make him look older than he did in Superman The Animated Series. Fans did not like the older appearance and in the second season the squint, grey streak and cheekbones were removed, in essence reverting Superman to his earlier animated look. As an in-joke, Superman's season one facial designs are used for an older Jor-El in the Justice League Unlimited episode "For the Man Who Has Everything". Furthermore, a common complaint in the first season of Justice League was Superman's powers being toned down even more than in Superman: The Animated Series to the point of being portrayed as unnaturally weak and vulnerable to harm, most episodes showing him being consistently taken down by foes he should not have a problem with. This was changed from the second season onwards, where his power-levels were upped.

Several actors in previous DCAU shows also reprise their roles, including Dana Delany as Lois Lane, David Kaufman as Jimmy Olsen, Efrem Zimbalist Jr. as Alfred Pennyworth, Shelley Fabares and Mike Farrell as Jonathan and Martha Kent, Mark Hamill as the Joker, Clancy Brown as Lex Luthor, Corey Burton as Brainiac, Ron Perlman as Clayface, Arleen Sorkin as Harley Quinn, Peri Gilpin as Volcana, Diane Pershing as Poison Ivy, Mark Rolston as Firefly, Ted Levine as Sinestro, Michael Ironside as Darkseid, Michael Dorn as Kalibak, Lisa Edelstein as Mercy Graves, and Brad Garrett as Lobo. Due to budgetary reasons in the episode "Hereafter," Corey Burton served as a substitute for Bud Cort as Toyman and Malcolm McDowell as Metallo, although both Cort and McDowell would reprise their roles in Justice League Unlimited. Likewise, Maria Canals (who provides the voice for Hawkgirl) voiced Livewire in the same episode, instead of Lori Petty.

Most of the characters retained their general comic book origins and continuity, with some notable changes. In the Justice League series continuity, the premiere story arc "Secret Origins" revises the plot of Diana's competition against her fellow Amazons to be the ambassador of peace to man's world, and she is referred to as a "rookie" superhero during her first encounter with the League. (Subsequent episodes touched on her attempts to adjust to her new world). In an interview segment on the Season One DVD, Bruce Timm stated that he initially ran into some legal issues in using the Wonder Woman character, but was adamant that she be used in the series. Additionally, the character of The Flash was portrayed as somewhat younger and significantly more brash than his comic book counterpart, taking on a number of personality traits of Plastic Man, who provides a similar comic relief function in the JLA comics. Major changes were also made to the Hawkgirl character. The character of Hawkgirl became romantically involved with the John Stewart Green Lantern as the series progressed. A romantic relationship between Batman and Wonder Woman was also "shown" (hinted at but never "official" unlike Hawkgirl/Green Lantern) by the show's creators, who disliked pairing Wonder Woman with Superman despite fan requests. Robin is not paired with Batman in this animated series like he was on Super Friends.

Although the series itself is animated in traditional 2-dimensional style, the opening credits are rendered in 3D with toon shading. The intro is a "stock" intro used throughout the series until Justice League Unlimited premieres.

Episodes

Voice cast

Main cast
 Kevin Conroy - Batman
 Maria Canals-Barrera - Hawkgirl
 Susan Eisenberg - Wonder Woman
 Phil LaMarr - Green Lantern
 Carl Lumbly - J'onn J'onzz
 George Newbern - Superman
 Michael Rosenbaum  - Flash

Home media
From 2006 to 2011, Warner Home Entertainment (via DC Entertainment and Warner Bros. Family Entertainment) released the entire series of Justice League on DVD and Blu-ray, and presented in original broadcast version and story arc continuity order.

Season releases

Warner Home Video also released another DVD set titled Justice League: The Complete Series. It contained all 91 episodes of Justice League and Justice League Unlimited on a 15-disc set with the 15th disc containing a bonus documentary. This was later re-packaged and sold as a 10-disc set without the bonus documentary.

Individual releases

Boxsets

Soundtrack
A 4-disc soundtrack of musical highlights from both seasons of Justice League was released by La-La Land Records in July 2016. It is a limited edition of 3000 units and can be ordered at the La-La Land Records website. The set includes tracks from fan-favorite episodes like A Better World, Hereafter, Wild Cards and Starcrossed.

La-La Land are hoping to release a soundtrack for Justice League Unlimited as well, provided that sales of the Justice League soundtrack improve significantly and that there is sufficient demand from fans. A second Justice League volume may also follow if fans support the existing release.

Broadcast history

The series premiere on November 17, 2001, set a Cartoon Network record with over 4.114 million viewers. This made it the channel's highest rated premiere ever, a record it would keep until September 13, 2009, when the world premiere of Scooby-Doo! The Mystery Begins gathered over 6.108 million viewers.

The show was aired in the Republic of Ireland on TG4 in both Irish and English from 6 September 2002 to 2007.

Reception
Justice League and Justice League Unlimited has received critical acclaim and is often listed as one of the best animated shows of all time, with praise for its stories, writing, character development, and voice acting. IGN named Justice League/Justice League Unlimited as the 20th best animated television series of all time. Similarly Indiewire also ranked Justice League as the 20th best animated show of all time.

Many fans including the creative team felt that season one of Justice League was a mixed bag, with the crew admitting it was a learning curve for them. Producer Bruce Timm had remarked "some of the first season episodes I think were really good, but we had so many challenges inherent in the show. So many balls juggling in the air, and inevitably some of them dropped." He further added "I think we were making a conscious effort to make it a little more of a family-friendly show, but unfortunately by pulling back on some of the more adult storylines, we didn't really replace it with anything. Something of a blandness set in with the show. We made steps to remedy that situation in Season Two, and to the point where I think the Season Two episodes make a much better show across the board. We're constantly calling it new improved Justice League."

Justice League season two on the other hand, is considered by fans to be one of the best seasons of the entire DC Animated Universe, with Oliver Sava from AV Club writing "good enough isn’t good enough." "That’s the philosophy for Justice League season two, according to producer Bruce Timm on the DVD commentary, and this two-part season opener is the perfect example of that new attitude in action. Just as Batman: The Animated Series set a new standard for solo superhero cartoon excellence, Justice League season two is only eclipsed by Justice League Unlimited as the strongest superhero-team series. Everything is of higher quality this season: the direction, animation, music, sound effects, and most importantly, the stories."

Accolades

Cancelled film and reboot 
Circa 2004, Bruce Timm announced that a direct-to-video Justice League feature film was being planned. The film was intended to make a bridge between the second season of Justice League to the first season of Justice League Unlimited. The film was planned to reveal how Wonder Woman acquired her Invisible-Jet, and also planned to feature the Crime Syndicate as the main antagonists, an idea that was originally conceived for the two-part episode "A Better World", until the Syndicate was replaced by the Justice Lords. Dwayne McDuffie wrote the script and Andrea Romano assembled the cast, but Warner Bros. finally scrapped the project. In 2010, however, the film's plot was used for the non-DCAU film Justice League: Crisis on Two Earths with all references to the continuity of the DC Animated Universe removed. Most notably of these changes is the replacement of John Stewart with Hal Jordan as the Justice League's Green Lantern.

Adaptations

Justice League Adventures
DC Comics published a series of 34-issue numbered comics based on the television series, between 2002 and 2004.
 #34 (2004-08-04): Guardians Against Darkness!

Compilations
 Justice League Adventures: The Magnificent Seven (2004-01-01): Includes #3, 6, 10–12.

See also

 Justice League Unlimited
 Justice League: Crisis on Two Earths

References

External links

 DC page: TV, comics
 
 
 
 Justice League at The World's Finest
 League Night a podcast reviewing every episode of the series.

 
2000s American animated television series
2000s American science fiction television series
2001 American television series debuts
2004 American television series endings
American children's animated action television series
American children's animated adventure television series
American children's animated science fantasy television series
American children's animated superhero television series
Animated Batman television series
Animated Justice League television series
Animated Superman television series
Animated television shows based on DC Comics
Crossover animated television series
English-language television shows
Green Lantern in other media
Television shows adapted into video games
Television series by Warner Bros. Animation
Television series by Warner Bros. Television Studios
Toonami
Wonder Woman in other media
Cartoon Network original programming